Chenoweth–Coulter Farm, also known as Shady Brook Farm, is a historic home and farm located in Wayne Township, Huntington County, Indiana. The farmhouse was built in 1866, and is a two-story, three bay, Greek Revival style brick I-house with a -story rear wing.  It has a one-story, Italianate/Gothic Revival style front porch.  Also on the property the contributing well house, wood house, garage, drive-through corn crib, chicken house, bank barn (1870), and privy.

It was listed on the National Register of Historic Places in 2009.

References

Farms on the National Register of Historic Places in Indiana
Greek Revival houses in Indiana
Gothic Revival architecture in Indiana
Italianate architecture in Indiana
Houses completed in 1866
Houses in Huntington County, Indiana
National Register of Historic Places in Huntington County, Indiana
1866 establishments in Indiana
I-houses in Indiana